List of rivers in Espírito Santo (Brazilian State).

The list is arranged by drainage basin from north to south, with respective tributaries indented under each larger stream's name and ordered from downstream to upstream. All rivers in Espírito Santo drain to the Atlantic Ocean.

By drainage basin 

 Itaúnas River
 Angelim River
 Preto River (Itauninhas River)
 Jundiaí River
 Braço Norte do Rio Itaúnas
 Itauninha River
 Braço Sul do Rio Itaúnas
 Santo Antônio River
 Veado River
 São Mateus River
 Santana River
 Mariricu River
 Preto River
 Braço Norte do Rio São Mateus (Cotaxé River)
 Quinze de Novembro River
 Dois de Setembro River
 Braço Sul do Rio São Mateus (Cricaré River)
 Freire Muniz River
 Preto River
 Barra Seca River
 Pau Atravessado River
 Cupido River
 Doce River
 São José River
 Moacir Ávidos River
 Pau Gigante River
 Baunilhas River
 Pancas River
 Panquinhas River
 Santa Maria do Rio Doce River
 Santa Júlia River
 Santa Joana River
 São João Pequeno River
 São João Grande River
 Mutum River
 Guandu River
 São Domingos Grande River
 Riacho River
 Gemuuma River
 Da Prata River
 Brejo Grande River
 Ribeirão River (Araraduara River)
 Lake Aguiar
 Quartel River
 Do Norte River
 Francês River
 Guaxindibe River
 Piraquê Açu River
 Piraquê-Mirim River
 Nova Lombárdia River
 Reis Magos River
 Fundão River
 Timbuí River
 Jacaraípe River
 Santa Maria da Vitória River
 São Miguel River
 Da Fumaça River
 São Sebastião River
 Jucu River
 Jacarandá River
 Calçado River
 Santo Agostinho River
 Jucu Braço Norte River
 Jucu Braço Sul River
 Fundo River
 Guarapari River
 Benevente River
 Pongal River
 Novo River
 Itapoama River
 Iconha River
 Itapemirim River
 Muqui do Norte River
 Castelo River
 Caxixa River
 Taquaraçu River
 Braço Norte Esquerdo River
 Alegre River
 Braço do Norte Direito River
 Itabapoana River
 Muribaca River
 Preto River
 Muqui do Sul River
 Calçado River
 Veado River
 Preto River

Alphabetically 

 Alegre River
 Angelim River
 Barra Seca River
 Baunilhas River
 Benevente River
 Braço do Norte Direito River
 Braço Norte Esquerdo River
 Brejo Grande River
 Calçado River
 Calçado River
 Castelo River
 Caxixa River
 Cupido River
 Doce River
 Dois de Setembro River
 Da Fumaça River
 Francês River
 Freire Muniz River
 Fundão River
 Fundo River
 Gemuuma River
 Guandu River
 Guarapari River
 Guaxindibe River
 Iconha River
 Itabapoana River
 Itapemirim River
 Itapoama River
 Itaúnas River
 Braço Norte do Rio Itaúnas
 Braço Sul do Rio Itaúnas
 Itauninha River
 Jacaraípe River
 Jacarandá River
 Jucu Braço Norte River
 Jucu Braço Sul River
 Jucu River
 Jundiaí River
 Mariricu River
 Moacir Ávidos River
 Muqui do Norte River
 Muqui do Sul River
 Muribaca River
 Mutum River
 Do Norte River
 Nova Lombárdia River
 Novo River
 Pancas River
 Panquinhas River
 Pau Atravessado River
 Pau Gigante River
 Piraquê Açu River
 Piraquê-Mirim River
 Pongal River
 Da Prata River
 Preto River
 Preto River
 Preto River
 Preto River (Itauninhas River)
 Preto River
 Quartel River
 Quinze de Novembro River
 Reis Magos River
 Riacho River
 Ribeirão River (Araraduara River)
 Santa Joana River
 Santa Júlia River
 Santa Maria da Vitória River
 Santa Maria do Rio Doce River
 Santana River
 Santo Agostinho River
 Santo Antônio River
 São Domingos Grande River
 São João Grande River
 São João Pequeno River
 São José River
 São Mateus River
 Braço Norte do Rio São Mateus (Cotaxé River)
 Braço Sul do Rio São Mateus (Cricaré River)
 São Miguel River
 São Sebastião River
 Taquaraçu River
 Timbuí River
 Veado River
 Veado River

References
 Map from Ministry of Transport
  GEOnet Names Server

 
Espirito Santo
Environment of Espírito Santo